The So Cal Challenge is an eight-team college basketball tournament held during Monday and Wednesday of Thanksgiving week of the NCAA Division I men's basketball season, with the inaugural tournament taking place in 2021. Following games held at campus sites, teams are placed into either the Sand Division or the Surf Division and compete for the tournament title in their division. Semifinal and final games are held at The Pavilion at JSerra in San Juan Capistrano, California. Each of the games played on campus in the days leading up to the main event involves one team from each division. The event is hosted by the Big West Conference.

Brackets

2022 
The 2022 tournament featured two Southern California teams: Cal State Northridge from the host Big West Conference and California Baptist, as well as Minnesota from the Big Ten Conference. On-campus games were hosted by the team listed second below. Following the on-campus games, teams were placed into either the Sand Division or the Surf Division without regard to the outcome of those games. Division semifinal winners met in the finals.

On-campus games
Game recaps:

Sand Division
Game recaps:

Surf Division
Game recaps: 

* – Denotes overtime period

2021 
The inaugural tournament featured Cal Poly from the host Big West Conference, three other schools located in California and TCU from the Big 12 Conference. On-campus games were hosted by the team listed second below. Following the on-campus games, teams were placed into either the Sand Division or the Surf Division without regard to the outcome of those games. Division semifinal winners met in the finals.

A women's beach volleyball event was held two weekends before the men's basketball tournament began.

On-campus games

Game recaps: 

* – Denotes overtime period

Sand Division
Game recaps: 

* – Denotes overtime period

Surf Division
Game recaps:

References

External links
 So Cal Challenge

College basketball competitions
College men's basketball competitions in the United States
Recurring sporting events established in 2021
2021 establishments in California
Basketball in California